In real algebraic geometry, Harnack's curve theorem, named after Axel Harnack, gives the possible numbers of connected components that an algebraic curve can have, in terms of the degree of the curve. For any algebraic curve of degree  in the real projective plane, the number of components  is bounded by

The maximum number is one more than the maximum genus of a curve of degree , attained when the curve is nonsingular. Moreover, any number of components in this range of possible values can be attained.

This theorem formed the background to Hilbert's sixteenth problem.

In a recent development a Harnack curve is shown to be a curve whose amoeba has area equal to the Newton polygon of the polynomial , which is called the characteristic curve of dimer models, and every Harnack curve is the spectral curve of some dimer model.()

References 
 Dmitrii Andreevich Gudkov, The topology of real projective algebraic varieties, Uspekhi Mat. Nauk 29 (1974), 3–79 (Russian), English transl., Russian Math. Surveys 29:4 (1974), 1–79
 Carl Gustav Axel Harnack, Ueber die Vieltheiligkeit der ebenen algebraischen Curven, Math. Ann. 10 (1876), 189–199
 George Wilson, Hilbert's sixteenth problem, Topology 17 (1978), 53–74
  
  

Real algebraic geometry
Theorems in algebraic geometry